Founded in 2000, the World Match Racing Tour (WMRT) features world class sailors including America’s Cup and Olympic champions, in a global championship series.  WMRT is sanctioned with ‘Special Event Status’ by World Sailing, the sport’s world governing body.  The winner of the WMRT each year is crowned official Match Racing World Champion.

Teams compete in different boats at from stage to stage of the World Match Racing Tour, however the boats supplied at each event are identical. Teams rotate boats throughout the event. This way, competing on the WMRT becomes about purely about the skill and strategy of the sailors.

As one of only eight officially sanctioned World Sailing ‘Special Events’ – including the America’s Cup and The Ocean Race – WMRT is also the longest running global professional sailing series in the sport.  Previous Tour Champions include six-time world champion Ian Williams (GBR), Peter Gilmour (AUS), Adam Minoprio (NZL), Phil Robertson (NZL), Taylor Canfield (ISV) and defending Champion Torvar Mirsky from Australia.

The World Match Racing Tour has long been regarded by professional sailors as a pathway to the America’s Cup and as an opportunity for teams to hone their match racing skills at the highest level.  Since 2000, the WMRT has been a match racing series for monohull match racing, however this was changed in 2015 following the introduction of the M32 multihulls to the Tour.  Following the recent change in the America’s Cup to foiling monohulls for the 36tth edition of the Cup in 2021 in Auckland, it is expected that WMRT will continue to include events in monohulls, multihulls and why not, even foiling boats, starting in 2019.

History

Foundation of the World Match Racing Tour
The World Match Racing Tour in its current format started in year 2000. However, many of its regattas started earlier, e.g. the King Edward VII Gold Cup (now known as the Argo Group Gold Cup) in 1937 with American Briggs Cunningham as the first winner.

During the mid-1990s, match racing receives greater interest and Fabergé, the cosmetic manufacturer used the brand Brut to form a match racing series. The series offered USD 250,000 of prize money, the highest prize awarded in sailing regattas. To win the big prize – and the Fabergé egg, the competitor had to win three out of five regattas in Bermuda, San Francisco, New York, Lymington and Séte – the Brut Cup.

In 1997, Russell Coutts and his Team Magic wins the Fabergé Egg and the USD250,000 prize money. Brut left as a sponsor after that leaving the match racing series in a state of limbo. Swedish Match takes over as sponsors of the match racing series in 1998 and the creation of Swedish Match Grand Prix Sailing began.

Swedish Match Tour (2000–2006)
In 2000, the Swedish Match Tour (formerly known as the Swedish Match Grand Prix Sailing) is awarded Special Event status by the International Sailing Federation. Bertrand Pacé is the winner of the tour. In 2005, the first Asian event in the match racing circuit – Monsoon Cup – is added and marks the 50th event on the Swedish Match Tour.

World Championship (2006–present)
In 2006, following the departure of title sponsor Swedish Match AB, the Swedish Match Tour was renamed to the World Match Racing Tour and gained status as the World Championship in match racing. The Korea Match Cup joined the World Match Racing Tour in 2008. Great Britain's Royal Jeweller’s, Garrard & Co created the World Match Racing Tour trophy in 2011. In 2012, ALPARI UK Ltd became title sponsor of the tour – renaming it as the Alpari World Match Racing Tour.

In 2015, the tour adopted a new format where competitions were grouped into two categories: World Championship events giving more points and World Tour events giving less points in the tour standings. For the 2016 tour, M32 became the equipment.

Sponsorship 
The World Match Racing Tour has been sponsored since 2000. The title sponsorship enables the tour's sponsorship name. There have been two sponsors since the tour's formation.

Winners

See also
Women's International Match Racing Series

References

External links
World Match Racing Tour Official Site
Link to BBC H2O interview with Sir Robin Knox-Johnston recorded 15 April 2010
Independent Newspaper article 'All-Australian final at Portimao, Portugal Match Cup' 28 June 2010
CNN Stena Match Cup Sweden video presented by Shirley Robertson 19 August 2010
Travel Places Tour destinations info
Latest 'World Match Racing Tour' Business News
'Boats on TV' coverage of Portimao, Portugal Match Race Cup '10
'World Match Racing Tour' coverage of Danish Open Final '10
Swiss franc shock forces West Ham shirt sponsor Alpari out of business
World Match Racing Tour: Ian Williams of GAC Pindar takes title for a record fifth time

 
Yachting races
Sailing series
World Sailing Special Events